Dear Diary, My Teen Angst Has a Bodycount is the debut studio album by American post-hardcore band From First to Last. It was released on June 29, 2004, through Epitaph Records.  The title was taken from a monologue in the film Heathers, in which Winona Ryder's character is writing in her diary. Production was handled by Lee Dyess and the band themselves. The album was remastered by Beau Burchell from Saosin, however, it is not indicated on the personnel, possibly due to a contemporary feud between the band. The album is also notable for being one of the earliest projects featuring singer and multi-instrumentalist Sonny Moore (who has since launched a successful solo career as an electronic music producer and performer, under the stage name Skrillex). The album received generally mixed reviews from music critics. It reached number 12 and 21 on the Billboard Heatseekers Albums and Independent Albums chart. It spawned two singles: "Ride the Wings of Pestilence" and "Note to Self". The hidden track (commonly referred to as "Dead Baby Kickball") features contributing vocals from American rapper Major League Playa. "Populace in Two" was included in the soundtrack for the video game Burnout 3: Takedown.
It was released on the iTunes store for download on July 26, 2005.

Track listing

B-Sides

Note that "Failure by Designer Jeans" isn't featured on any album by From First to Last. It is featured on Punk-O-Rama 10.

Personnel
From First to Last
 Sonny Moore – lead vocals, additional guitar, programming
 Matt Good – co-lead vocals, lead guitar, keyboard, background vocals
 Travis Richter –  rhythm guitar, unclean vocals, background vocals
 Jon Weisberg –  bass, unclean vocals
 Derek Bloom – drums, percussion

Additional musicians
 Major League Playa – vocals (on "Untitled")

Production
 Lee Dyess – production, mixing
 Beau Burchell  – mastering, mixing
 Brian Gardner – mastering
 Nick Pritchard – album design
 Adam Krause – photography
 Cody Nierstadt – design

References

External links
 
 

From First to Last albums
2004 debut albums
Epitaph Records albums